Almaden Reservoir is an artificial lake in the hills south of San Jose, California in the United States. It borders on the  Almaden Quicksilver County Park, which provides limited fishing ("catch-and-release"), picnicking, hiking, and horseback riding activities.  Swimming and boating are not permitted in the reservoir.

The California Office of Environmental Health Hazard Assessment has issued a "Do Not Eat" advisory for any fish caught in Almaden Reservoir due to elevated levels of mercury.

History 
The reservoir was formed by the Almaden Dam, built in 1936 across Alamitos Creek near the community of New Almaden. Its waters reach the San Francisco Bay by way of the Guadalupe River.  It is one of the smaller reservoirs owned by the Santa Clara Valley Water District.

Almaden Dam 

See also 
 List of dams and reservoirs in California
 List of lakes in California
 List of lakes in the San Francisco Bay Area

References 

Reservoirs in Santa Clara County, California
Reservoirs in California
Reservoirs in Northern California